Margotti is an Italian surname. Notable people with the surname include:

Carlo Margotti (1891–1951), Italian prelate of the Catholic Church
Giacomo Margotti (1823–1887), Italian Roman Catholic priest and journalist
Stefano Margotti (1900–?), Italian sports shooter

Italian-language surnames